Mehereta Baruch-Ron is a politician in the State of Israel.

Baruch-Ron was the deputy mayor of Tel Aviv-Yafo. Baruch-Ron is the first Ethiopian to be elected to serve on the Tel Aviv-Yafo city council, and the first to serve as deputy mayor.

References

Living people
City councillors of Tel Aviv-Yafo
Israeli people of Ethiopian-Jewish descent
Deputy Mayors of Tel Aviv-Yafo
Year of birth missing (living people)